Shafi Muhammad Shah (or Shafi Mohammad) PP (7 September 1949–17 November 2007) was a Pakistani film and television actor. Popularly known as Shah-jee, he was born in Kandiaro, Naushahro Feroze District, Sindh.

Career 
Shafi began his career as a radio presenter from the Hyderabad radio station. He obtained a postgraduate degree from the University of Sindh, Jamshoro. He later moved to Karachi and began his career as an actor.

Shah was introduced by PTV producer late 'Shahzad Khalil' in his Urdu-drama serial "Teesra Kinara" from where he joined the elite club of the leading TV stars.

Notable television plays
Aanch
Bund Gulab
Chand Grehan
Dairey
Deewarain
Jungle
Adam Hawa aur shaitan
Zeenat
Kali Dhoop
Marvi
Mohabbat Khawab Ki Surat
 Mannat (Maa Aur Mamta)
Tapish
Teesra Kinara
Zehar Baad
Dhori (Ary Digital)
Kaanton sey aagey (Tv one)

Muhib Sheedi (1992) (Sindhi language)
Ilzam (1993)
Muskarahat (1995)
Salakhain

Death

Shafi Muhammad Shah died while asleep at his Clifton home on 17 November 2007. His funeral prayers were held at Imambargah Yasreb in the Defence Housing Authority. He was buried in the Defence graveyard. The cause of death was liver failure.

Social activity
On 12 March 2004 Shafi Mohammad Shah joined Pakistan based UNICEF and WHO to help alarm the parents of minor children about taking vaccinations against Polio

Tribute and honour
In 1985 he received best actor award from Pakistan Television.

At 9th PTV Awards he won Best Actor Award in 1998

In 2007, the participants at Karachi Press Club (KPC) paid tribute to actor Shafi Mohammad Shah at the Karachi Press Club (KPC). This meeting was organised by the KPC's cultural committee, in which several artists paid tribute to Shah, including Anwar Solangi, Manzoor Qureshi and Mumtaz Kanwal.

On 16 November 2008, the first death-anniversary of Shafi Mohammad Shah, a book titled "Wo aadmi tha ya moti dana (Was He A Human Or Bead of Pearl)" authored by Nagina Hisbani on the life and artistic performance of Shah. This launching ceremony had been organised by the Sindh Fankaar Welfare Trust, at the Mumtaz Mirza Auditorium.

Shafi Shah won Best Actor Drama Series in The 1st Indus Drama Awards 2005 for Maa Aur Mamta (Mannat). He was also recipient of 'Pride of Performance Award' from the President of Pakistan.

Accolades

See also 
 List of Lollywood actors

References

External links
Shafi Muhammad Shah Profile – Pakistan Television
Remembering Shafi Muhammad – Musiq Pakistan.com
Shafi Muhammad Shah Unmatched Legacy – Pakistani.tv

1949 births
20th-century Pakistani male actors
2007 deaths
Sindhi people
People from Naushahro Feroze District
Pakistani male television actors
PTV Award winners
Pakistani male film actors
21st-century Pakistani male actors
Recipients of the Pride of Performance
University of Sindh alumni
Pakistani Shia Muslims
Male actors from Karachi